The 1975 ECAC Hockey Men's Ice Hockey Tournament was the 14th tournament in league history. It was played between March 4 and March 8, 1975. Quarterfinal games were played at home team campus sites, while the 'final four' games were played at the Boston Garden in Boston, Massachusetts. By reaching the championship game both, Boston University and Harvard received invitations to participate in the 1975 NCAA Division I Men's Ice Hockey Tournament.

Format
The tournament featured three rounds of play, all of which were single-elimination. The top eight teams, based on winning percentage, qualified to participate in the tournament. In the quarterfinals the first seed and eighth seed, the second seed and seventh seed, the third seed and sixth seed and the fourth seed and fifth seed played against one another. In the semifinals, the highest seed plays the lowest remaining seed while the two remaining teams play with the winners advancing to the championship game and the losers advancing to the third place game.

Conference standings
Note: GP = Games played; W = Wins; L = Losses; T = Ties; Pct. = Winning percentage; GF = Goals for; GA = Goals against

Bracket
Teams are reseeded after the first round

Note: * denotes overtime period(s)

Quarterfinals

(1) Harvard vs. (8) Clarkson

(2) Boston University vs. (7) Brown

(3) Vermont vs. (6) Providence

(4) Cornell vs. (5) New Hampshire

Semifinals

(1) Harvard vs. (4) Cornell

(2) Boston University vs. (3) Vermont

Third Place

(3) Vermont vs. (4) Cornell

Championship

(1) Harvard vs. (2) Boston University

Tournament awards

All-Tournament Team
None

MOP
Rick Meagher (Boston University)

References

External links
ECAC Hockey
1974–75 ECAC Hockey Standings
1974–75 NCAA Standings

ECAC Hockey Men's Ice Hockey Tournament
ECAC tournament